Linkon Dey is a Bangladeshi cricketer. He made his first-class debut for Barisal Division in the 2017–18 National Cricket League on 20 December 2017.

References

External links
 

Date of birth missing (living people)
Living people
Bangladeshi cricketers
Barisal Division cricketers
Place of birth missing (living people)
Year of birth missing (living people)